Saturday's Heroes is a 1937 American drama film directed by Edward Killy from a screenplay by Paul Yawitz, Charles Kaufman, and David Silverstein based on George Templeton's story. Produced and distributed by RKO Radio Pictures, the film stars Van Heflin, Marian Marsh, Richard Lane, Alan Bruce, and Willie Best.

Plot
Val Webster is the quarterback of Calton College's football team, but besides dealing with criticism of his play, Val needs money, which he gets by scalping tickets to the games.

A teammate, Ted Calkins, commits suicide after being caught moonlighting at a job, and Val's ticket scheme is exposed as well, causing university president Hammond to expel him. Disgusted by the hypocrisy in college athletics, where the school reaps hundreds of thousands of dollars while the athletes stay broke, Val teams with sportswriter Red Watson to bring attention to the matter, with girlfriend Frances providing moral support.

Val lands a job coaching for a rival college. When its game against Calton comes up, the outcome convinces Hammond and others that something must be done to change the unjust way student-athletes are rewarded for their play.

Cast
 Van Heflin as Val Webster
 Marian Marsh as Frances Thomas     
 Richard Lane as Red I. Watson
 Alan Bruce as Burgeson
 Minor Watson as Doc Thomas
 Frank Jenks as Dubrowsky
 Willie Best as Sam
 Walter Miller as Coach Banks
 Crawford Weaver as Baker
 George Irving as President Hammond
 John Arledge as Ted Calkins
 Dick Hogan as Freshman
 Al St. John as Andy Jones
 Charles Trowbridge as President Horace C. Mitchell

(cast list as per AFI database)

References

External links

1937 films
1937 drama films
American black-and-white films
American drama films
American football films
Films set in universities and colleges
RKO Pictures films
Films directed by Edward Killy
1930s English-language films
1930s American films